The RN-11 National Highway is a national highway in Djibouti. It runs from Tadjoura on the Gulf of Tadjoura through the mountains to the Ethiopian border on the west.

References

Roads in Djibouti